Noreen Kokoruda (August 4, 1947 – December 21, 2022) was an American politician who served in the Connecticut House of Representatives from the 101st district from 2011 to 2021. She lost re-election to Democratic challenger John-Michael Parker in 2020 after narrowly defeating him in 2018.

Electoral History

2006

2011

2012

2014

2016

2018

2020

References

1947 births
2022 deaths
21st-century American politicians
21st-century American women politicians
Republican Party members of the Connecticut House of Representatives
Politicians from Bridgeport, Connecticut
Women state legislators in Connecticut